Miscibility is the property of two substances to mix in all proportions (that is, to fully dissolve in each other at any concentration), forming a homogeneous mixture (a solution). The term is most often applied to liquids but also applies to solids and gases. An example in liquids is the miscibility of water and ethanol as they mix in all proportions.

By contrast, substances are said to be immiscible if there are certain proportions in which the mixture does not form a solution. For one example, oil is not soluble in water, so these two solvents are immiscible. As another example, butanone (methyl ethyl ketone) is significantly soluble in water, but these two solvents are also immiscible because in some proportions the mixture will separate into two phases.

Organic compounds 
In organic compounds, the weight percent of hydrocarbon chain often determines the compound's miscibility with water.  For example, among the alcohols, ethanol has two carbon atoms and is miscible with water, whereas 1-butanol with four carbons is not. 1-Octanol, with eight carbons, is practically insoluble in water, and its immiscibility leads it to be used as a standard for partition equilibria. The straight-chain carboxylic acids up to butanoic acid (with four carbon atoms) are miscible with water, pentanoic acid (with five carbons) is partly soluble, and hexanoic acid (with six) is practically insoluble, as are longer fatty acids and other lipids; the very long carbon chains of lipids cause them almost always to be immiscible with water. Analogous situations occur for other functional groups such as aldehydes and ketones.

Metals 
Immiscible metals are unable to form alloys with each other. Typically, a mixture will be possible in the molten state, but upon freezing, the metals separate into layers. This property allows solid precipitates to be formed by rapidly freezing a molten mixture of immiscible metals. One example of immiscibility in metals is copper and cobalt, where rapid freezing to form solid precipitates has been used to create granular GMR materials.

There also exist metals that are immiscible in the liquid state. One with industrial importance is that liquid zinc and liquid silver are immiscible in liquid lead, while silver is miscible in zinc. This leads to the Parkes process, an example of liquid-liquid extraction, whereby lead containing any amount of silver is melted with zinc. The silver migrates to the zinc, which is skimmed off the top of the two-phase liquid, and the zinc is then boiled away, leaving nearly pure silver.

Effect of entropy 

If a mixture of polymers has lower configurational entropy than the components, they are likely to be immiscible in one another even in the liquid state.

Determination 
Miscibility of two materials is often determined optically.  When the two miscible liquids are combined, the resulting liquid is clear. If the mixture is cloudy the two materials are immiscible. Care must be taken with this determination. If the indices of refraction of the two materials are similar, an immiscible mixture may be clear and give an incorrect determination that the two liquids are miscible.

See also 
 Miscibility gap
 Emulsion
 Heteroazeotrope
 ITIES
 Multiphasic liquid

References 

Chemical properties